Irina Petrovna Glushkova (born 9 August 1952) is a Soviet and Russian indologist and philologist, a chief researcher of the Institute of Oriental Studies of the Russian Academy of Sciences, specializing in the study of Dnyaneshwar and the Varkari tradition of Maharashtra, India. She was nominated as the ambassador of Maharashtra tourism and culture in Russia by then Chief Minister Devendra Fadnavis on 11 July 2016.

Publications
 Indiĭskoe palomnichestvo : metafora dvizhenii︠a︡ i dvizhenie metafory, 2000
 Iz indiĭskoĭ korziny : istoricheskie interpretat︠s︡ii, 2003
 Podvizhnostʹ i podvizhnichestvo : teorii︠a︡ i praktika tirtkha-i︠a︡try, 2008
 Semanticheskie priznaki abstraktnogo obraza, 2012

References

1952 births
Living people
Russian philologists
Women philologists
Women linguists
Russian Indologists
Russian women historians